Leopoldstadt is a play by Sir Tom Stoppard, originally directed by Patrick Marber, which premiered on 25 January 2020 at Wyndham's Theatre in London's West End. The play is set among the Jewish community of Vienna in the first half of the 20th century and follows the lives of "a prosperous Jewish family who had fled the pogroms in the East". According to Stoppard, the play "took a year to write, but the gestation was much longer. Quite a lot of it is personal to me, but I made it about a Viennese family so that it wouldn't seem to be about me." All four of Stoppard's grandparents were Jews murdered by Nazis in concentration camps. On 2 October 2022, the production opened on Broadway at the Longacre Theatre with Marber directing.

A National Theatre Live recording was screened in over 380 cinemas on 27 January (Holocaust Memorial Day), 2022 and topped that night's UK and Ireland box office. The play's second preview performance had also taken place on Holocaust Memorial Day, in 2020, when each audience member was given a memorial candle as they left the theatre.

Background
Patrick Marber, who worked with Stoppard on the revival of Travesties in London and New York, commented that "It's a big company play which as a director is incredibly exciting to do. It's got the lot." During rehearsals he "instituted a fabulous regime of lectures" given by cast members, allotting each a subject relevant to the play's themes to investigate.

Leopoldstadt's original run at Wyndham's — which had no seat unsold at any performance — was interrupted by the COVID-19 pandemic, with the production temporarily shut down on 16 March 2020. On 25 October 2020 Leopoldstadt won the Olivier Award for American Airlines' Best New Play, and Adrian Scarborough won for Best Actor in a Supporting Role. After Covid restrictions were lifted in England the play re-opened and ran from 7 August to 30 October 2021.

Stoppard told BBC Radio 4 that Leopoldstadt may be his last play — though in October 2021 he acknowledged, in a CNN interview with Christiane Amanpour, that he was reconsidering: “I'm a playwright, by more than, as it were, labeling. I feel like somebody who writes plays while they're still alive.”

The Wyndham's production's set design was by Richard Hudson, costumes by Brigitte Reiffenstuel, lighting by Neil Austin, sound and original music by Adam Cork and movement by EJ Boyle. Leopoldstadt is the sixth collaboration between Sonia Friedman Productions and Stoppard. The 41 actors performing in the 2020 production were cast by Amy Ball (adults) and Verity Naughton (children). The initial cast list was announced on 25 October 2019 and included Adrian Scarborough, Alexis Zegerman, Luke Thallon and Stoppard's son, Ed.

The play had its North American premiere on Broadway at the Longacre Theatre when it started previews on 14 September 2022 and opened on 2 October. Its originally intended North American premiere was to have taken place at the Princess of Wales Theatre in Toronto, for a seven-week engagement with the London cast, however it was announced that the run would no longer go ahead because of the COVID-19 pandemic. The theatre's owner, David Mirvish, said "... I'm not giving up on Leopoldstadt. I'm determined to present this magnificent play in Toronto sometime in the future when it is safe to do so."

Synopsis
Leopoldstadt frames the narrative of a Jewish family in Vienna over a period of some 50 years. The main set is the drawing room of a wealthy family. There are five acts occurring in the years 1899, 1900, 1924, 1938 and 1955.

 1899: the family gathers for Christmas, discussing ideas ranging from Zionism to Jewish and Viennese arts and culture. Family members have integrated well with Viennese society, and enjoy their rights and civil liberties. Hanna asks Gretl to chaperone her on a date with a non-Jewish cavalry officer, Fritz. Hermann’s nephew, Pauli, expresses an interest in becoming a soldier.
 1900: Gretl and Fritz strike up an affair, which Gretl eventually ends. Hermann gains knowledge of this, but ultimately dismisses Gretl's infidelity. The family gather for Passover Seder, celebrating the birth of Hermann’s niece, Nellie.
 1924: Jacob, the son of Hermann and Gretl, fought in World War I alongside Pauli. Pauli was killed in battle; Jacob survived but had his arm amputated. The family gather for a circumcision. This act explores the impacts of the Great War and the rise of Bolshevism. Fearing for the worst, Hermann meets with a banker to discuss transferring the family business to Jacob.
 1938: the year of Anschluss. The family are gathered, with the company of a British journalist who is engaged to one of the girls in the family. The family discuss escape plans, including visas to England. The Nazis enter the property, harassing the family and seizing their belongings. The family's home is requisitioned by the Nazis and the family must leave to be transported the following day. Hermann is forced to sign the family business away to the Nazis, but Jacob retains legal ownership. It is revealed that Jacob is the legal son of Gretl and Fritz; Hermann planned and acknowledged the affair so that Jacob would not face antisemitism since he would be legally recorded as a gentile.
 1955: the survivors of the Holocaust gather in the family home. Only three family members survived: Leo, who successfully gained a British visa and assimilated into British culture; Rosa, who moved to New York before the Holocaust; and Nathan, who survived Auschwitz. Leo has no memory of his life in Vienna as a Jew; the family painfully recollect their memories and acknowledge their murdered family members.

Original cast

NT Live screenings
A performance of the play, recorded towards the end of its second run, was screened in UK cinemas (and some international locations) on 27 January 2022 (Holocaust Memorial Day) through National Theatre Live.

Critical reception
The play has been generally well received. Theatre critic and journalist Dominic Cavendish wrote in The Telegraph, "So here it is. Tom Stoppard's last play. Very possibly. Britain's greatest living dramatist has said that Leopoldstadt is likely to be the end of the road – given his age (82) and how long it takes him to write. Almost every major work he has produced since he burst onto the scene with his Hamlet spin-off Rosencrantz and Guildenstern Are Dead in 1966 has been met with high anticipation."

Whilst Lloyd Evans wrote in The Spectator, "History will record Leopoldstadt as Tom Stoppard's Schindler's List. His brilliant tragic-comic play opens in the Jewish quarter of Vienna in 1899. We meet a family of intellectuals and businessmen who are celebrating their very first Christmas. (...) At press night, the critics were busy scribbling one-liners which are destined to reach the dictionary of quotations. ‘Why do Jews have to choose between pushy and humble?’ ‘Today's modern is tomorrow's nostalgia: we missed Mahler when we heard Schoenberg.’"

Greg Evans wrote in Deadline that with Leopoldstadt Stoppard delivered "a late career masterpiece." Evans added that "any summary of scenes and timeline descriptions of Leopoldstadt can’t begin to convey the richness of Stoppard’s work," noting that "mathematics, not surprisingly, comes into play, as it so often does with Stoppard, but so too does Zionism and modern art and so many other aspects of 20th Century political history that Leopoldstadt can at times seem like a right and proper companion piece to Ken Burns’ wonderful The U.S. and The Holocaust documentary."

Awards and nominations

Original West End production

References

External links
 Official website
 Leopoldstadt on Twitter
 Leopoldstadt at the Princess of Wales Theatre, Toronto
 NTLive Leopoldstadt

2020 plays
Jews and Judaism in fiction
Plays about the Holocaust
Plays about Jews and Judaism
Plays by Tom Stoppard
Plays set in Vienna
West End plays